State Road 22 (SR 22) runs east and west from US 98 Business in Springfield to SR 71 in Wewahitchka.  SR 22 is known as East 3rd Street in Springfield and Wewa Highway from Callaway to Wewahitchka. With the exception of the intersection with US 98 in Callaway, SR 22 is entirely a two-lane undivided highway, and is far more rural east of Callaway.

Beginning one block south of SR 22's eastern terminus, County Road 22 (CR 22) extends the route to the banks of the Apalachicola River. Several other disconnected segments of CR 22 exist in the Apalachicola National Forest and other protected areas to the east, evidencing a former plan to extend SR 22 to Sopchoppy via Sumatra.

Major intersections

References

External links

Florida Route Log (SR 22)
Florida State Road 22(SouthEastRoads.com)

022
022
022
022
022
022